This article contains a chronological summary of major events from the 2011 Pan American Games in Guadalajara, Mexico.

Calendar
In the following calendar for the 2011 Pan American Games, each blue box represents an event competition, such as a qualification round, on that day. The yellow boxes represent days during which medal-awarding finals for a sport are held. The number in each box represents the number of finals that will be contested on that day.

Day 1 – October 14 (Opening ceremony)
  Opening ceremony

Starting at 8:00 pm CDT (UTC−6), the three-hour opening ceremony was attended by 50,000 spectators. The spectacle was directed by production company Five Currents, and the Pan American Cauldron was lit by former Mexican diver Paola Espinosa.

Day 2 – October 15
 Cycling
Heather Irmiger of the United States wins the women's cross country event in mountain biking, becoming the first gold medalist of the games. While Hector Páez of Colombia wins the men's event.

 Gymnastics
Julie Zetlin of the United States wins the first rhythmic gymnastics medal on offer in the individual all around competition.

 Modern pentathlon
Margaux Isaksen of the United States wins the gold medal in the women's individual event, as three other athletes along with Isaksen from Mexico, Canada and Argentina qualify for the 2012 Summer Olympics in London, Great Britain.

 Swimming
The United States team wins four out of the five gold medals, in the process setting one Pan American Games record. Brazil wins the only other gold medal.

 Taekwondo
Gabriel Mercedes of the Dominican Republic defends his title in the men's 58 kg event, while Ivett Gonda of Canada wins the gold medal in the women's 49 kg event.

Day 3 – October 16
 Cycling
Colombian athletes win both gold medals in the road cycling time trial events.

 Equestrian
The United States wins the gold medal in the team dressage event, successfully defending their championship for the fourth straight Pan American Games.

 Gymnastics
Brazil wins the group event by shocking favourites Canada for the title, in the process claiming its second straight title.

 Modern pentathlon
Óscar Soto of the hosts Mexico wins the gold medal in the men's individual event, as three other athletes along with Soto from Guatemala, Chile and United States qualify for the 2012 Summer Olympics in London, Great Britain.

 Shooting
Daryl Szarenszki wins the gold medal in the 10m air pistol event with a new Pan American record in the qualifications and finals. Dorothy Ludwig of Canada wins the women's event, coming back on the last shot to win by 0.1 points and qualify a spot for Canada at the 2012 Summer Olympics.

 Swimming
Brazil and the United States continue their dominance in the pool with Brazil picking up three gold medals, while the United States picking up the rest with two.

 Taekwondo
Jhohanny Jean of the Dominican Republic wins the second straight gold medal for his country the men's 68 kg event, while Irma Contreras of Mexico wins the gold medal in the women's 57 kg event.

Athletes with a * competed in preliminaries only and received medals.

Day 4 – October 17
 Cycling
Colombia wins the men's team pursuit, while Venezuela sets new Pan American Records in the men's and women's team sprints

 Gymnastics
Brazil wins the 5 balls group event, while the United States and Mexico pick up one gold each.

 Rowing
Argentina wins three out of the four gold medals on offer while Cuba takes the remaining title.

 Shooting
The United States wins the gold medal in the men's (Matthew Rawlings) and women's (Emily Caruso) 10 metre air rifle events.

 Squash
Mexico wins the men's and women's singles and doubles events. Colombia wins the men's singles event.

 Swimming
Brazil and the United States continue their dominance in the pool as each win two gold medals.

 Table tennis
Brazil successfully defends the men's team title, while the Dominican Republic wins the women's team title.

 Taekwondo
Sebastián Crismanich of Argentina wins the men's 80 kg event, while Melissa Pangotta of Canada wins the women's 67 kg event.

Day 5 – October 18
 Cycling
Canada breaks the Pan American Games record twice en route to a gold medal performance. Lisandra Guerra of Cuba wins the women's individual sprint.

  Gymnastics
Canada wins both golds in the trampoline competition, while Brazil sweeps the gold medals in the group event as it wins the 3 ribbons + 2 hoops event. The United States and Mexico also picked up one gold medal each in the individual apparatus finals in rhythmic gymnastics, as that event came to a close.

 Rowing
United States and Mexico each pick up two gold medals while Argentina pick up the only other gold medal on offer.

 Shooting
Guatemala wins its first gold medal in the men's 50 meter pistol event, while the United States wins the women's trap.

 Swimming
Brett Fraser wins the Cayman Islands first ever Pan American Games gold medal by setting a new Pan American Games record in the men's 200 meter freestyle event. The United States wins the other four gold medals that were awarded today.

 Taekwondo
Cuba wins both events today (the men's +80 and women's +67 kg classes), as taekwondo competitions also come to a close.

Day 6 – October 19
 Badminton
Canada wins two gold medals, while Guatemala takes home two gold medals, as Canada tops the medal table at the start of the badminton events.

 Cycling
Juan Arango of Colombia becomes the first ever Pan American Games champion in the men's omnium, while Hersony Canelón of Venezuela wins the men's individual sprint.

 Equestrian
The United States sweeps the individual dressage medals

 Rowing
Cuba takes three of five gold medals available, after previously not taking any gold medals in rowing. Argentina and the United States take one gold each as the rowing competitions come to a close.

 Shooting
The United States, Brazil and Guatemala each win one gold medal, as the latter two set final round Pan American Games records.

 Swimming
The United States continued its dominance in the pool by winning three out of five golds, while second place Brazil wins one gold. Chile wins its first gold medal at the games in the women's 800 meters freestyle event.

Day 7 – October 20
 Badminton
Canada wins two gold medals, while Guatemala takes home two gold medals, as Canada tops the medal table at the conclusion of the badminton events.

 Cycling
Angie González of Venezuela becomes the first Pan American Games champion in the women's omnium. Colombia and Venezuela win one gold each more as the track cycling competition comes to a close.

 Shooting
United States wins the men's double trap event.

 Swimming
The first night of the swimming competition that the United States does not win more than one gold medal. Brazil, Venezuela and Canada win one gold each the latter two winning their first gold medals of the swimming competition.

 Synchronized swimming
Canada wins the women's duet event and qualifies to compete at the 2012 Summer Olympics in London, Great Britain.

 Table tennis
Zhang Mo of Canada and Liu Song of Argentina win the gold medal in the women's and men's individual event respectively and qualify to compete at the 2012 Summer Olympics in London, Great Britain.

 Volleyball
Brazil defeats Cuba in a thrilling five set gold medal match, and wins the first gold medal awarded in a team sport.

 Wrestling
Cuba wins all five gold medals available in Greco-Roman wrestling today.

Day 8 – October 21
 Archery
The United States and Mexico each contested the finals of both team events with the USA men and the Mexican women taking gold. The USA men set a 24 arrows Pan American record during the semifinals as well. Cuba took the bronze medal in both events.

 Beach volleyball
The Brazilian pair of Larissa França and Juliana Felisberta win the women's tournament.

 Cycling
Connor Fields of the United States wins the men's bmx event, while Mariana Pajón of Colombia wins the women's event.

 Shooting
The United States wins both gold medals on offer today.

 Squash
Canada wins the women's team event, while Mexico wins the men's team event.

 Swimming
The United States continues its dominance in the pool by winning two gold medals. Brazil, the distant runner-up also takes two gold medals.

 Synchronized swimming
Canada completes the sweep in synchronized swimming by winning the team event.

 Tennis
The United States and Argentina win the women's singles and doubles events respectively, while Ana Paula de la Penã and Santiago González of Mexico become the first Pan American Games Champion in Mixed Doubles tennis since 1995.

 Wrestling
Cuba continued its dominance in Greco-Roman wrestling by taking two out of three gold medals available (6 of 7 overall). Venezuela took the remaining gold.

Day 9 – October 22
 Archery
The United States men's and the Mexican women's team finished the competition by winning the singles events.

 Beach volleyball
Brazil completes the sweep of the beach volleyball gold medals.

 Cycling
Marc de Maar of the Netherlands Antilles wins the men's road race competing under the Pan American Sports Organization Flag, while Arlenis Sierra leads Cuba to a sweep in the women's road race.

 Racquetball
Mexico wins three out of four gold medals available while the United States wins the only other gold medal on offer.

 Shooting
The United States wins two gold medals, finishing the competition with ten of the fifteen gold medals available. Cuba picks up the only other gold medal won today.

 Swimming
The final events of the swimming competition were held as the open water swimming competition for men and women were held in Puerto Vallarta. Cecilia Biagioli of Argentina and Richard Weinberger of Canada win the women's and men's events respectively.

 Tennis
Robert Farah of Colombia wins the men's singles event and the doubles event with partner Juan Sebastián Cabal as the tennis events come to a close.

 Water skiing
The United States wins the first two gold medals in water skiing, while Argentina wins one gold medal. Canada wins three medals as well.

 Wrestling
Carol Huynh of Canada defends her title she won four years ago in at the 2007 Pan American Games, while Cuba continues its dominance in wrestling by winning two out of the four women's freestyle gold medals. The United States won the remaining gold medal.

Day 10 – October 23
 Athletics

 Equestrian
The United States wins the team eventing event, while Canada wins the individual eventing event. Brazil and Argentina who placed third and fourth respectively in the team event qualify a full team to compete at the 2012 Summer Olympics in London, Great Britain (the United States and Canada have already qualified).

 Handball

 Sailing
All nine sailing events come to a close, with Brazil taking five gold medals, Argentina winning two, Chile and Puerto Rico winning one gold medal each.

 Softball
The United States wins its record seventh straight gold medal, while Canada takes silver and Cuba takes bronze.

 Triathlon

 Water skiing

 Weightlifting

 Wrestling

Day 11 – October 24
 Athletics

 Fencing

 Gymnastics

 Handball

 Roller skating

 Weightlifting

 Wrestling

Day 12 – October 25
 Athletics

 Baseball

 Basketball

 Bowling

 Fencing

 Gymnastics

 Racquetball

 Weightlifting

Day 13 – October 26
 Athletics

 Basque pelota

 Canoeing

 Diving

 Fencing

 Gymnastics

 Judo

 Roller skating

 Weightlifting

Day 14 – October 27
 Athletics

 Basque pelota

 Bowling

 Canoeing

 Diving

 Equestrian

 Fencing

 Football

 Gymnastics

 Judo

 Karate

 Roller skating

 Weightlifting

Day 15 – October 28
 Athletics

 Boxing

 Canoeing

 Diving

 Fencing

 Field hockey

 Football

 Gymnastics

 Judo

 Karate

 Water polo

Day 16 – October 29
 Athletics

 Boxing

 Canoeing

 Diving

 Equestrian

 Fencing

 Field hockey

 Judo

 Karate

 Volleyball

 Water polo

Day 17 – October 30
 Athletics

 Basketball

 Rugby sevens

  Closing ceremony

References

2011 Pan American Games
Chronological summaries of the Pan American Games